Mamadou Diallo (born 17 April 1982) is a Malian former professional footballer who played as a striker. He spent most of his professional career in France.

Career statistics
Scores and results list Mali's goal tally first, score column indicates score after each Diallo goal.

References

External links
 
 
 
 Mamadou Diallo Interview

Living people
1982 births
Sportspeople from Bamako
Association football forwards
Malian footballers
JS Centre Salif Keita players
USM Alger players
FC Nantes players
Qatar SC players
Al Jazira Club players
Le Havre AC players
CS Sedan Ardennes players
Stade Lavallois players
A.F.C. Tubize players
Algerian Ligue Professionnelle 1 players
Ligue 1 players
Ligue 2 players
UAE Pro League players
Qatar Stars League players
Challenger Pro League players
Malian expatriate footballers
Mali international footballers
2008 Africa Cup of Nations players
2010 Africa Cup of Nations players
Expatriate footballers in Belgium
Expatriate footballers in France
Expatriate footballers in Qatar
Expatriate footballers in the United Arab Emirates
Footballers at the 2004 Summer Olympics
Olympic footballers of Mali
Malian expatriate sportspeople in Algeria
Expatriate footballers in Algeria
21st-century Malian people